
Restaurant Chagali is a defunct restaurant in Leidschendam, Netherlands. It was a fine dining restaurant that was awarded one Michelin star in 1983 and retained that rating until 1991.

The restaurant closed down before 1993, as the Michelin Guide 1993 mentioned restaurant Green Park at that address.

See also
List of Michelin starred restaurants in the Netherlands

References 

Restaurants in the Netherlands
Michelin Guide starred restaurants in the Netherlands
Defunct restaurants in the Netherlands